Atkinson & Hilgard's Introduction to Psychology is an introductory textbook on psychology written originally by Ernest Hilgard, Richard C. Atkinson and Rita L. Atkinson and edited and revised by Edward E. Smith, Daryl J. Bem, Susan Nolen-Hoeksema, Barbara L. Fredrickson, Geoff R. Loftus and Willem A. Wagenaar. Sixteen editions of Introduction to Psychology have been published between 1953 and 2014. The text is organized around the major discoveries of psychology research and is strongly biological in its approach to psychology. Eventually the book was translated into French, German, Hebrew, Hungarian, Italian, Portuguese, Romanian, Spanish, Czech, Croatian, Persian, Chinese and Japanese.

References

English-language books
Psychology textbooks
1953 non-fiction books